Eucalyptus halophila, also known as salt lake mallee, is a species of mallee or a shrub, that is endemic to Western Australia. It has smooth white and grey bark, sometimes rough and fibrous on the lower trunk, linear to narrow elliptic adult leaves, flower buds usually in grows of seven, white flowers and shortened spherical to barrel-shaped fruit.

Description
It has smooth white and pale grey bark, sometimes with fibrous bark on the lower half of its stems. Flowering occurs from January to May and the flowers are creamy white.

Taxonomy and naming
Eucalyptus halophila was first formally described in 1980 by Denis and Maisie Carr from a specimen Maisie collected with Alex George near a small salt pan near Dalyup. The description was published in the journal Nuytsia. The specific epithet (halophila) is derived from ancient Greek word meaning "salt" with the ending -philus meaning "loving", referring to the habitat of this species.

Distribution and habitat
Salt lake mallee grows in sandy clay soils on flat areas in shrubland adjacent to salt lakes. It is only known from the catchment of the Dalyup River between Dalyup and Mount Ney near Esperance in the Esperance Plains  and Mallee biogeographic regions.

Conservation status
Eucalyptus halophila is classified as "not threatened" by the Western Australian Government Department of Parks and Wildlife.

Use in horticulture
The plant is available commercially in seed form or as tubestock and is grown as an ornamental or low shelter plant. It is tolerant of frost, salt and drought and has a moderately fast growth rate.

See also
List of Eucalyptus species

References

halophila
Endemic flora of Western Australia
Mallees (habit)
Myrtales of Australia
Eucalypts of Western Australia
Goldfields-Esperance
Plants described in 1980
Taxa named by Maisie Carr